Chand sitara is a popular reality television program patterned after American Idol; it airs on the Ariana TV satellite network and is dedicated to Afghan Music. "Chand Sitara" stands for "How Many Stars?"  The program consists of music videos sent to the show by musicians.  People then call in or email how many stars the song deserves and the winner is displayed a week later.  The program is hosted by Naim Arzo and Omar Bakhtari (aka DJ Mast).

The show airs on Tuesday nights from 7:30 to 10:00 pm Pacific time. 

Afghan television series